Elza Ivanovna Lezhdey (19 February 1933 — 12 June 2001) is a Soviet and Russian actress. She was best recognized for her role as Zinaida Kibrit in Investigation Held by ZnaToKi. Appearing in more than fifty films from 1954 to 1992, she was awarded Honored Art Worker of the RSFSR in 1974.

She died on June 12, 2001, at the age of 68.

Filmography 
 The Frigid Sea (1954) as Varvara
 The First Echelon (1955) as Tamara
 Pavel Korchagin (1956) as Rita Ustinovich
 The Wind (1959) as Mari
 Ballad of a Soldier (1959) as Vasya's wife
 The Hockey Players (1965) as Maya
 Straight Line (1967) as Emma
 Investigation Held by ZnaToKi (1971-1989) as Zinaida Kibrit

References

External links 
 

1933 births
2001 deaths
20th-century Russian actresses
21st-century Russian actresses
Soviet actresses
Honored Artists of the RSFSR